Vanderpump Dogs is an American reality television series that ran on Peacock on June 9, 2021. Developed as the second spin-off of The Real Housewives of Beverly Hills, it focuses on Lisa Vanderpump and her staff as they run her dog foundation/rescue center, Vanderpump Dogs.

Plot
The series follows Lisa Vanderpump as she runs her dog foundation/rescue center, Vanderpump Dogs, along with her staff, and those who come to the foundation to adopt a new pet.

Cast 

 Andrew Y. Kushnir, the veterinarian at Vanderpump Dogs

 Summer Loftis, the director of marketing at Vanderpump Dogs

 Brian L. Marshall, a pet stylist at Vanderpump Dogs

 Patrick Miller-Wren, a pet stylist at Vanderpump Dogs

 Madeline Quint, the dog trainer at Vanderpump Dogs
 Lisa Vanderpump, the owner and manager of The Vanderpump Dog Foundation Rescue Center

 Kendall Young, the communications director at Vanderpump Dogs

Episodes

Production
In July 2020, it was announced Peacock had ordered a series revolving around Lisa Vanderpump and her dog foundation, The Vanderpump Dog Foundation. Vanderpump, Ken Todd, Douglas Ross, Alex Baskin, Bill Langworthy and Brian McCarthy serve as executive producers, with Evolution Media serving as the studio on the series.

References

External links
 

English-language television shows
Television shows set in Los Angeles
Peacock (streaming service) original programming
2020s American reality television series
2021 American television series debuts
Television shows about dogs